Zografski, Зографски is a Bulgarian surname. Notable people with the surname include:

Emil Zografski (born 1968), Bulgarian ski jumper
Parteniy Zografski (1818–1876), Bulgarian cleric
Vladimir Zografski (born 1993), Bulgarian ski jumper
Tomislav Zografski (born 1934), Macedonian composer

See also
Zograf (surname)
Zografos

Bulgarian-language surnames